Urangeline East is a rural community in the central part of the Riverina.  It is situated by road, about 9 kilometres southeast from Urangeline and 19 kilometres east from Bidgeemia.

Bendabo Post Office opened on 1 November 1928, was renamed Urangeline East in 1930 and closed in 1971.

It was serviced by the Rand branch railway line before the line was closed in 1975.

Notes and references

External links

 Urangeline East Railway Siding

Towns in the Riverina
Towns in New South Wales